Pablo Álvarez Núñez (born 14 May 1980) is a Spanish former professional footballer who played as a right midfielder.

Club career
Born in Oviedo, Asturias, Álvarez started his professional career at neighbouring Sporting de Gijón, making his first-team debut on 19 May 2001 in a 1–2 home defeat against Real Betis in the second division and going on to appear in 168 games across all competitions. At Gijón, he earned the nickname Tibu (diminutive of Tiburón, shark in Spanish) for his goal celebrations, in which he pretended to have a shark's fin in his head.

Álvarez also participated in the resurrection of the unofficial Galician national team in December 2005, playing their first game after 75 years against Uruguay. He signed for Deportivo de La Coruña on a Bosman transfer in August 2006.

On 3 February 2007, Álvarez played his first league match for Depor, making his La Liga debut against RCD Mallorca at the age of nearly 27. He had suffered a serious leg injury while still at the service of Sporting, in April 2006, and was eventually loaned to Racing de Santander in December of the following year until the end of the season.

After being relatively used in a Cantabria side that achieved a first-ever qualification to the UEFA Cup – netting in a 2–0 away victory over CA Osasuna on 13 January 2008– Álvarez returned to Galicia and Deportivo. Scarcely used during 2008–09, he profited from a rare start to score the game's only goal at Athletic Bilbao, on 18 April 2009; he made his debut in European competition on 18 February of that year, playing the full 90 minutes in a 0–3 away loss against AaB Fodbold for the UEFA Cup, and was sent off in the second leg in an eventual 1–6 aggregate score.

In the summer of 2012, aged 32, Álvarez joined CD Lugo of the second level on a two-year deal, returning to the club after playing youth football there for nearly a decade. On 2 September 2014, he signed with UP Langreo in the third tier; however, after only six months, he moved abroad for the first time in his career, agreeing to a deal at New York City FC on 6 March 2015 after a trial period.

Honours
Deportivo
Segunda División: 2011–12

References

External links
Deportivo official profile 

1980 births
Living people
Footballers from Oviedo
Spanish footballers
Association football midfielders
La Liga players
Segunda División players
Segunda División B players
Tercera División players
CD Lugo players
Sporting de Gijón B players
Sporting de Gijón players
Deportivo de La Coruña players
Racing de Santander players
UP Langreo footballers
Major League Soccer players
USL Championship players
New York City FC players
Wilmington Hammerheads FC players
Spanish expatriate footballers
Expatriate soccer players in the United States
Spanish expatriate sportspeople in the United States